Nick Kelly (born 25 July 1993) is an Australian-born New Zealand cricketer who plays for Northern Districts. He made his first-class debut on 23 October 2015 in the 2015–16 Plunket Shield. He made his List A debut on 6 January 2016 in the 2015–16 Ford Trophy. In June 2018, he was awarded a contract with Northern Districts for the 2018–19 season.

In June 2020, he was offered a contract by Otago ahead of the 2020–21 domestic cricket season.

References

External links
 

1993 births
Living people
New Zealand cricketers
Northern Districts cricketers
Otago cricketers
Cricketers from Melbourne